Qowsheh-ye Olya (also Romanized as Qowsheh-ye ‘Olyā; also known as Qowsheh-ye Bālā and Qūsheh Bālā) is a village in Arshaq-e Shomali Rural District, Arshaq District, Meshgin Shahr County, Ardabil Province, Iran. At the 2006 census, its population was 375, in 78 families.

References 

Tageo

Towns and villages in Meshgin Shahr County